The Festival della Scienza is an annual science festival held in Genoa, Italy. It was launched in 2003 combining hundreds of different initiatives and events, designed to fulfill and stimulate the interest of visitors of all ages and all levels of knowledge. Modulation in diverse formats and original languages is always one of features of the Festival. The aim of the array of interdisciplinary proposals is to overcome the traditional opposition between scientific and humanistic culture. Events include scientific exhibitions, workshops, interactive educational experiences, photography and "art-science"  exhibitions, conferences, round tables, performances, music and films.

History

2003: "Beyond"

In its first edition, from 23 October to 3 November 2003, the Science Festival faces the theme of the interdisciplinarity of research, condensing the concept of a scientific culture in continuous expansion into the key word Beyond. 
With the participation of :

2004: "Exploration"

In its second edition, from 28 October to 8 November 2004, part of the calendar of official events of Genoa European Capital of Culture and into the events recognised by the European Union in the context of the European Week of Scientific Culture (ESW), the Science Festival faces the theme of Exploration: from the new frontiers reached in the most various fields of research to the progressive tendency in many sciences to leave their specific boundaries and to compare themselves with other fields.
With the participation of :

2005: "Frontiers"

The third edition of the Science Festival, from 27 October to 8 November 2005, is dedicated to the key theme of Frontiers, in the sense of the meeting points between the known and the unknown, of the limits which must continuously be moved back, of boundaries and thresholds of different forms of knowledge, to be constantly overcome by new forms of interdisciplinary research.
With the participation of :

2006: "Discovery"

In its fourth edition, from 26 October to 7 November 2006, the Science Festival faces the key theme of Discovery and gains a further international ennoblement with UNESCO's decision to celebrate the World Day of Science for Peace a Development in Genoa on 7 November, the final day of the event, organised with IPSO (Israeli-Palestinian Science Organization). 
With the participation of :

2007: "Curiosity"

The fifth edition of the Science Festival, held from 25 October to 6 November 2007, dealt with the theme of Curiosity, consolidated the popularity of the event and enhanced its international scope.
After having been short-listed as one of the 10 Best Practices in Scientific Popularisation by the European Union Commission, the presentation press conference held at CERN in Geneva was a further confirmation of the international scope of the event. 
A record-breaking edition, in terms of both quality and quantity with over 250 thousand visitors.
With the participation of :

2008: "Diversity"

The sixth edition held from 23 October to 4 November 2008, chooses the common thread of Diversity and for the first time divides the over 350 events on the programme in six different theme areas which represents a virtual interdisciplinary "narrative" route depending on which point of view the main concept is to be analyzed.
With the participation of :

2009: "Future"

The 2009 edition is dedicated to the Future, a topic which science can help us to decode by offering interpretations of that are important to our understanding of what tomorrow will be like.
With the participation of :

From 4 to 13 December, a few of the best of the format is led to Palermo for the first Sicily edition of the Festival.

International Partnerships 

 Masad - Mediterranean Association for Science Advancement and Dissemination
 Euscea - European Science Events Association
 Ecsite - European Network of Science Centres and Museums
 Marseille Provence 2013 - European Capital of Culture 2013
 SAST – Shanghai Association for Science and Technology

References

External links
Festival della Scienza website

Science festivals
Recurring events established in 2003
Science events in Italy
Annual events in Italy
2003 establishments in Italy
Genoa
Autumn events in Italy